DaveGrohl is a brute-force password cracker for macOS. It was originally created in 2010 as a password hash extractor but has since evolved into a standalone or distributed password cracker. DaveGrohl supports all of the standard Mac OS X user password hashes (MD4, SHA-512 and PBKDF2) used since OS X Lion and also can extract them formatted for other popular password crackers like John the Ripper.  The latest stable release is designed specifically for Mac OS X Lion and Mountain Lion.

Attack Methods 
DaveGrohl supports both dictionary and incremental attacks. A dictionary attack will scan through a number of pre-defined wordlists while an incremental attack will count through a character set until it finds the password. While in distributed mode, it uses Bonjour to find all the server nodes on the local network and therefore requires no configuration.

See also 
 Password cracking
 Key stretching
 Aircrack-ng
 Cain and Abel
 Crack
 Hashcat
 John the Ripper

References

External links 
 
 Cracking Mac OS Lion Passwords

Password cracking software
Free security software